Siliquaria muricata is a species of sea snail, a marine gastropod mollusk in the family Siliquariidae.

Description

Distribution
This species occurs in the Indian Ocean off Madagascar.

References

 Dautzenberg, P. (1923). Liste préliminaire des mollusques marins de Madagascar et description de deux espèces nouvelles. Journal de Conchyliologie 68: 21–74

External links

Siliquariidae
Gastropods described in 1780